Hobson is an unincorporated community in Randolph County, Alabama, United States, located  east-southeast of Wedowee.

References

Unincorporated communities in Randolph County, Alabama
Unincorporated communities in Alabama